The Frank Lloyd Wright Home and Studio is a historic house and design studio in Oak Park, Illinois, which was designed and owned by architect Frank Lloyd Wright.  First built in 1889 and added to over the years, the home and studio is furnished with original Wright-designed furniture and textiles. It has been restored by the Frank Lloyd Wright Preservation Trust to its appearance in 1909, the last year Wright lived there with his family. Here, Wright worked on his career and aesthetic to become one of the most influential architects of the 20th century.

The property was listed on the National Register of Historic Places in 1972, declared a National Historic Landmark four years later, and contributes to the Frank Lloyd Wright–Prairie School of Architecture Historic District containing a number of his projects and related work.

History
Located in Oak Park, Illinois, Frank Lloyd Wright was 22 years old when he purchased the property and built the home in 1889 with a $5,000 loan from his employer Louis Sullivan. Wright had just married 18 year old Catherine Tobin. The Wrights raised six children in the home. 
The original 1889 structure was quite small. In 1895, the home was extensively remodeled, when among other changes the kitchen was enlarged and converted to a dining room, the upstairs nursery was expanded and converted for use as Wrights wife Catherine Lee "Kitty" Tobin's dayroom, and the Children's Playroom and a new kitchen were added to the back of the house. From 1890 to 1895 Wright and his wife had 4 of their altogether 6 children: Frank Lloyd Wright Jr.(1890), John Lloyd Wright (1892), Catherine Wright (1894), David Samuel Wright (1895) followed by Frances Wright Caroe (1898) and Robert Llwellyn Wright (1903).

In 1898, a second major addition was made, when the Studio and Connecting Corridor were built. In the Studio, Frank Lloyd Wright and associated architects like Walter Burley Griffin and sculptor Richard Bock advanced the Prairie School of Architecture and designed many notable structures, including the Robie House, Unity Temple, the Laura Gale home, and the Larkin building. After 1909, Wright converted the Studio into a residence for his wife and the younger children.

Later on, the Home and Studio became an apartment building. In the 1960s it fell into disrepair as the owners began to neglect the property due to financial problems. During this time they also made some parts of the property available for public tours. The longtime roofing company entrusted by Frank Lloyd Wright, Oak Park-based Tuscher Roofing, took control of the property. In 1974, the structure was handed over to the National Trust for Historic Preservation and the 13-year restoration began.

In 1976, the Home and Studio was declared a National Historic Landmark. It is owned by the National Trust for Historic Preservation, and has been restored, maintained, and operated as a museum by The Frank Lloyd Wright Preservation Trust. Every May, the Frank Lloyd Wright Preservation Trust hosts a housewalk of the home and studio and various private homes.

Frank Lloyd Wright's Home and Studio is located in one of three historic districts of Oak Park, Illinois. It is specifically found in the Frank Lloyd Wright-Prairie School of Architecture Historic District, which includes 27 Wright-designed structures as well as other historical and architecturally significant buildings.

Architectural principles
In his first house Wright realized his ideal of an open living space: there is no door between hallway and living room. The family was supposed to live together, though in practice he rather withdrew to his drawing room. Technically the house was cutting edge with electricity and telephone. The playroom was the most beautiful room; this has been interpreted that the architect gave his children what he was unable to give as a father or "at heart he was the 7th child of the family".

Sculptures
Most of the sculptures on the exterior of the Home and studio were designed by Wright's friend and collaborator, Richard Bock. These include the two boulder figures flanking the entrance of the studio, which features a man crouching and breaking free from the ground beneath him. Bock also designed the stork capitals on the exterior loggia of the studio. The capitals signifies the tree of life, the book of knowledge, an architectural scroll, and two storks full of wisdom and fertility.

Wright's home included many sculptures on the interior which added to and contrasted with the anti-Victorian decor. These objects include a frieze from the Pergamon Altar and several sizes of Winged Victory of Samothrace as well as a bust of Beethoven.

Gallery

See also
Frank Lloyd Wright Building Conservancy
Frank Lloyd Wright-Prairie School of Architecture Historic District
List of Frank Lloyd Wright works, chronological list of houses, commercial buildings and other works by Frank Lloyd Wright
List of Frank Lloyd Wright works by location, covering 4 countries and 36 of the United States

References

 Storrer, William Allin. The Frank Lloyd Wright Companion. University Of Chicago Press, 2006,  (S.002)

External links

The Frank Lloyd Wright Preservation Trust
ShopWright.org

High-resolution 360° Panoramas and Images of Frank Lloyd Wright Home and Studio | Art Atlas

Architecture museums in the United States
Art museums and galleries in Illinois
Artists' studios in the United States
Biographical museums in Illinois
Frank Lloyd Wright buildings
Frank Lloyd Wright Prairie School of Architecture Historic District
Historic house museums in Illinois
Houses completed in 1889
Houses on the National Register of Historic Places in Cook County, Illinois
Museums in Cook County, Illinois
National Historic Landmarks in Illinois
Historic American Buildings Survey in Illinois
Oak Park, Illinois
Individually listed contributing properties to historic districts on the National Register in Illinois
1889 establishments in Illinois
Museums devoted to one artist